The Parti Rakyat Gabungan Jaksa Pendamai or Justices of Peace Coalition People's Party (PEACE); or just shortly known as Peace Party is a political party based in Sarawak, Malaysia. It received permission to operate as a political party in 2013 and was among the 20 new parties registration approved by the Registrar of Society (RoS). The party's founder and president Julian Petrus Jout announced that the party's aims were among other things, for Sarawak to get 50 percent royalty in oil and gas, as well as for the government to appoint a minister in charge of non-Muslim affairs and rights.

State election results

See also
Politics of Malaysia
List of political parties in Malaysia

References

Political parties in Sarawak
Political parties with year of establishment missing